Phillip W. Ehart (born February 4, 1950) is the drummer in the progressive rock band Kansas. He and Rich Williams are the only two members who have appeared on every Kansas album. Though his songwriting contributions to the group were few, he co-wrote two of their biggest hits, "Point of Know Return" and "Play the Game Tonight". He has also taken on the band's management responsibilities in recent years.

Early life
Born in Coffeyville, Kansas on February 4, 1950, Ehart took up the drums in grade school. He lived all over the world as his Air Force father was stationed in such places as England, the Philippines and Japan.

Career
Ehart contacted Kerry Livgren about joining a band named White Clover after hearing that Livgren's band Kansas (the second band of that name) had recently disbanded. With White Clover he performed at the New Orleans Pop Festival in 1969, which had a huge impact on him. White Clover in time renamed itself "Kansas." This third Kansas is the band that became the well-known American progressive rock band.

In the early 1970s Ehart, like many American musicians, wanted to more closely study and play the "British" style of music that was popular at the time, so he moved to England. He did not find the atmosphere welcoming, as the musicians there were happier to learn the country and rhythm and blues styles that Ehart brought with him, so he quickly returned to America.  In 1978, he and Kansas singer Steve Walsh were invited to play on Steve Hackett's second solo album, Please Don't Touch.

Ehart is currently an endorser of Yamaha drums, Evans drumheads, Promark drumsticks and is a longtime user of Zildjian cymbals.  Past endorsements included Ludwig drums, DW drums, Slingerland drums and Paiste cymbals.

Personal life
Phil Ehart is a father of one son, Noah, and one daughter, Avery. Due to Noah's autism, Ehart has become an autism advocate and traveled to Washington, D.C., to speak at the Unlocking Autism Power of One conference in 2001. He resides in Henry County, Georgia with his wife, Laurie, just outside of Atlanta where his house was specially crafted for his son's autism needs.

References 

American rock drummers
Kansas (band) members
Musicians from Kansas
People from Coffeyville, Kansas
Living people
1950 births
American rock percussionists
20th-century American drummers
American male drummers
Progressive rock drummers